Maximilian Mbaeva (born 14 April 1989) is a Namibian international footballer who plays for South African club Lamontville Golden Arrows, as a goalkeeper.

Career
He was born in Windhoek.

Mbaeva has played club football for African Stars and Lamontville Golden Arrows.

He made his international debut for Namibia in 2008.

References

1989 births
Living people
Footballers from Windhoek
Namibia international footballers
African Stars F.C. players
Lamontville Golden Arrows F.C. players
Association football goalkeepers
Namibian expatriate footballers
Namibian expatriate sportspeople in South Africa
Expatriate soccer players in South Africa
2019 Africa Cup of Nations players
South African Premier Division players
National First Division players
Namibian men's footballers